Nannostomus bifasciatus, (from the Greek: nanos = small, and the Latin stomus = relating to the mouth; from the Latin: bifasciatus = two bands), is a freshwater species of fish belonging to the characin family Lebiasinidae. It is commonly known as the two-lined pencilfish.  It can be found in slow-moving swamps and rivers in French Guiana and Suriname.

References

Lebiasinidae
Fish described in 1954
Fish of South America
Fish of the Amazon basin